The 1941 Central Michigan Bearcats football team represented Central Michigan College of Education, later renamed Central Michigan University, as an independent during the 1941 college football season. In their fifth season under head coach Ron Finch, the Bearcats compiled a 4–3 record and were outscored by their opponents by a combined total of 76 to 44. The team held six of seven opponents to fewer than seven points, but lost in a 45–0 rout against Gus Dorais' 1942 Detroit Titans football team.

Schedule

References

Central Michigan
Central Michigan Chippewas football seasons
Central Michigan Bearcats football